Diego Nicolás Ciz Vaz Torres (born May 31, 1981) is a former football defender from Uruguay.

Career
Ciz started his career in the youth divisions of Peñarol but was released and went on to sign for Rocha F.C. where he made his debut in professional football. While in Rocha, Ciz was part of the team that won the 2005 Apertura.

In 2007 Ciz was transferred to the giant club Olimpia of Paraguay.

In early 2010, after not having much chances to play with Olimpia, he was loaned to the Romanian side Rapid Bucharest.

On 19 December 2010, Ciz has signed a two-year contract with Paraguayan side Sol de América.

See also
 List of expatriate footballers in Paraguay
 Players and Records in Paraguayan Football

References

External links
 Diego Ciz at BDFA.com
 
 
 

1981 births
Living people
Uruguayan footballers
Uruguayan expatriate footballers
Rocha F.C. players
Club Olimpia footballers
FC Rapid București players
Club Sol de América footballers
Sportivo Luqueño players
Liga I players
Expatriate footballers in Paraguay
Expatriate footballers in Romania
Association football defenders
Footballers from Montevideo